Pool D of the First Round of the 2006 World Baseball Classic was held at Cracker Jack Stadium, Lake Buena Vista, Florida, United States from March 7 to 10, 2006.

Pool D was a round-robin tournament. Each team played the other three teams once, with the top two teams advancing to Pool 2.

Standings

Results
All times are Eastern Standard Time (UTC−05:00).

Dominican Republic 11, Venezuela 5

Italy 10, Australia 0

Venezuela 6, Italy 0

Dominican Republic 8, Italy 3

Venezuela 2, Australia 0

Dominican Republic 6, Australia 4

External links
Official website

Pool D
World Baseball Classic Pool D
Baseball competitions in Florida
International baseball competitions hosted by the United States
International sports competitions in Florida
World Baseball Classic Pool D
Sports in Kissimmee, Florida
Events in Kissimmee, Florida